Paul Hunter (1978–2006) was an English snooker player.

Paul Hunter may also refer to:
Paul Hunter (soccer, born 1956), Canadian soccer player, who played predominantly in the United States
Paul Hunter (Scottish footballer) (born 1968)
Paul Hunter (Australian footballer) (born 1993), Australian rules footballer
Paul Hunter (microbiologist)  (fl. 1980s–), professor of medicine at the University of East Anglia
Paul Hunter (director) (fl. 1990s–), American music video director
Paul Hunter (journalist) (fl. 1990s–), Canadian journalist
Paul M. Hunter, co-founder of Hunter Industries

Fictional
Paul Hunter (River City), a character on River City

See also 
Paul Hunter Classic, a minor-ranking snooker tournament
Paul Hunter Peckham, biomedical engineer